Kristen Faulkner (born December 18, 1992) is an American professional racing cyclist, who currently rides for UCI Women's Continental Team . Her first year cycling professionally, she was also working full-time as an investment associate at Threshold Ventures, an early stage venture capital firm in Silicon Valley.

Biography
Faulkner was born in Homer, Alaska. She was raised in the Alaskan fishing community along with four siblings.

Faulkner graduated from Harvard in 2016 with a B.A in Computer Science, where she competed in varsity rowing. She holds the university's record for fastest 2k indoor rowing time for lightweight women. Before that, she attended Phillips Academy in Massachusetts, where she was an honor roll student and varsity runner, swimmer, and rower.

Faulkner started competitive cycling in New York City in 2017. She moved to the San Francisco Bay Area in 2018 and joined Team Tibco–Silicon Valley Bank in 2020.

Major results

2020
 1st Super Sweetwater, Grasshopper Adventure Series race
 1st Stage 4 Tour Cycliste Féminin International de l'Ardèche
2021
 3rd Overall Tour of Norway
1st Stage 1
 3rd GP de Plouay
 7th Gent–Wevelgem
 10th Tour of Flanders
2022
 Giro Donne
1st  Mountains classification
1st Prologue (ITT) & Stage 9
 2nd Overall Tour de Suisse
1st Stage 2 (ITT)
 3rd Overall Itzulia Women
 3rd Navarra Elite Classics
 4th Emakumeen Nafarroako Klasikoa

References

External links

Living people
1992 births
American female cyclists
People from Homer, Alaska
Harvard Crimson women's rowers
21st-century American women
20th-century American women